Melaleuca globifera is a shrub in the myrtle family, Myrtaceae and is endemic to the south-west of Western Australia. It is a bushy, small tree with papery bark and spherical heads of flowers on the ends of the branches.

Description 

The flowers are in heads at the ends of branches that continue to grow after flowering (and sometimes in the upper leaf axils). Each head has between 12 and 20 groups of flowers in threes  in diameter. The stamens are white to creamy yellow, arranged in 5 bundles around the flower, each bundle containing 7 to 10 stamens.

Taxonomy and naming
This species was first formally described in 1812 by Robert Brown  in the Hortus Kewensis of William Aiton. The specific epithet (globifera) is from the Latin globus and -fer meaning "carrying", referring to the spherical fruiting clusters of this species.

Distribution and habitat
Melaleuca globifera occurs on the coast near Esperance including the Cape le Grand and Cape Arid national parks, and on the nearby islands of the Recherche Archipelago in the Esperance Plains biogeographic region. It grows on white or grey sand, on granite outcrops and near salt lakes.

Conservation status
This melaleuca is listed as "not threatened" by the Government of Western Australia Department of Parks and Wildlife.

References

globifera
Myrtales of Australia
Rosids of Western Australia
Plants described in 1812
Endemic flora of Western Australia